James E. Krekorian (born 1952) is a professional American bridge player from New York City. He is an options trader and a graduate from Duke University, where he lettered in track.

Bridge accomplishments

Awards

 Herman Trophy (1) 2006

Wins

 North American Bridge Championships (6)
 Blue Ribbon Pairs (1) 1996 
 Nail Life Master Open Pairs (1) 1986 
 North American Pairs (2) 1992, 2009 
 Senior Knockout Teams (1) 2010 
 Mitchell Board-a-Match Teams (1) 1997

Runners-up

 North American Bridge Championships
 Blue Ribbon Pairs (1) 2006 
 Jacoby Open Swiss Teams (2) 1986, 1990 
 Vanderbilt (2) 1987, 2005 
 Senior Knockout Teams (1) 2011 
 Mitchell Board-a-Match Teams (1) 2006

Notes

Living people
1952 births
Place of birth missing (living people)
Date of birth missing (living people)
American contract bridge players
Duke University alumni
Businesspeople from New York City